Nazanin Malaei (born 28 January 1992) is an Iranian rower. She competed in the 2020 Summer Olympics.

References

External links

1992 births
Living people
People from Bandar-e Anzali
Rowers at the 2020 Summer Olympics
Iranian female rowers
Olympic rowers of Iran
Asian Games silver medalists for Iran
Asian Games bronze medalists for Iran
Asian Games medalists in rowing
Rowers at the 2010 Asian Games
Rowers at the 2014 Asian Games
Rowers at the 2018 Asian Games
Medalists at the 2014 Asian Games
Medalists at the 2018 Asian Games
Sportspeople from Gilan province